A cosmonaut or astronaut is a person trained by a human spaceflight program to command, pilot, or serve as a crew member of a spacecraft.

Cosmonaut may also refer to:
Cosmonaut (film), a 2009 Italian coming-of-age film
The Cosmonaut, a 2013 Spanish science fiction film
Cosmonauts Sea, a sea of the Southern Ocean off Antarctica
Cosmonaut Glacier, a tributary glacier in the Southern Cross Mountains, Antarctica
Cosmonaut (album), by Bump of Chicken
Cosmonaut, a side project of the band Finch

See also
Cosmonauts Alley, a wide avenue in northern Moscow 
Astronaut (disambiguation)